The Sirens, The Sirens' Song or Nereids is an 1887 bronze sculpture with a brown patina. It was created by Auguste Rodin and cast by the Rudier Foundry.

Use
He also used the figure on the top left of The Gates of Hell and it also formed the inspiration for his The Poet's Death and his work on the Vittorio Emmanuele II Monument. The work is alluded to in Victor Hugo's play Cromwell, when Rochester remarks to Francisca "My queen, my goddess, my nymph, my siren!".

See also
List of sculptures by Auguste Rodin

References

External links

1887 sculptures
Sculptures of the Museo Soumaya
Sculptures by Auguste Rodin
Bronze sculptures in Mexico